Capperia trichodactyla is a moth of the family Pterophoridae. It is found in central and southern Europe.

The wingspan is 15–20 mm.

The larvae feed on motherwort (Leonurus cardiaca).

References

Oxyptilini
Moths described in 1775
Plume moths of Europe
Taxa named by Michael Denis
Taxa named by Ignaz Schiffermüller